Chennai (erstwhile Madras) is the capital of the South Indian state of Tamil Nadu, located on Coramandel coast off Bay of Bengal. Christianity arrived to Chennai with St. Thomas around 50CE. Portuguese arrived in 1522 and built a port called "San thome" (present Santhome in Chennai) and "Santhome Church" after the Christian apostle, St. Thomas, who is believed to have preached in the area between 52 and 70 CE. The English East India Company under Francis Day bought lands in Chennai and made On 22 August 1639 as Madras Day. A year later, the English built Fort St. George, the first major English settlement in India, Chennai has seen missionaries from Scotland, United Kingdom and France and Portugal and also missionaries of Franciscans, Jesuits and Dominicans.

Santhome Church 

Santhome Church is believed to be the oldest Church in Chennai, while there were a lot of churches built during the colonial empire.In 72 AD a small structure of building(church) was built to mark the tomb of Thomas the Apostle in the coast of Mylapore(presently Santhome, Chennai), later on a big church was built in the same place on 1523 by Portuguese explorers. This church became cathedral on 1606 by Pope Paul V with erecting the Diocese of Saint Thomas of Mylapore .Later this church was rebuilt with a status of cathedral in 1896 by British in late 19th century style as Gothic Revival architecture.The exact place where St. Thomas was buried is marked by the second small tower in the center of the cathedral. Pope Pius XII honoured this cathedral church, elevating it to the dignity and rank of minor basilica in March 1956. Pope John Paul II the only pope visited Santhome Church in the year of 1986. This church was extended as National Shrine in 2004 by Catholic Bishops' Conference of India. This church is called "National Shrine of Saint Thomas Cathedral Basilica", Shortly known as "Santhome Church".It is a very Important church for worldwide Christians as it is the tomb of St. Thomas the Apostle.

Reference
Santhome Church 
Diocese of Saint Thomas of Mylapore
History of Chennai
Roman Catholic Archdiocese of Madras and Mylapore

Famous Church in Chennai

First row : 
 Shrine of Saint Thomas in Little Mount, Saidapet

Second row : 
 Santhome Church in Santhome, Mylapore.
 St. Mary's Church in Fort St. George.
 Saint Thomas Mount National Shrine in St. Thomas Mount.
Third row : 
 Armenian church in Armenian Street, George Town
 Church of Our Lady of Light in Mylapore.
 St Mary's Co-Cathedral in Armenian Street, George Town.

Open places of worship

Cathedral in Chennai 

 Santhome Cathedral of Roman Catholic denomination.
 St. George Cathedral of Church of South India denomination.
 St . Mary's Co'Cathedral of Roman Catholic denomination.
 St. Antony's Cathedral of Syro Malabar Catholic denomination.
 St. Thomas Cathedral of Malankara Orthodox Syrian Church denomination.

Basilica in Chennai

 St. Thomas Cathedral Basilica, Chennai in Santhome.

Shrine in Chennai

 Luz Church in Mylapore.
 Santhome Church in Santhome. (One of the National Shrine in India)
 Sacred heart Shrine in Egmore.
 Votive Shrine of Immaculate heart of Mary in Kilpauk.
 Annai Velankanni Shrine in Besant Nagar, Chennai.
 Shrine of Saint Thomas in Saidapet. 
 Saint Jude Shrine in Madipakkam.

Notes

References

 

 
Chennai-related lists
Chennai
Churches in Chennai
Chennai